WLMG (101.9 FM, "Magic 101.9 FM") is a commercial radio station licensed to New Orleans, Louisiana.  Owned by Audacy, Inc., it broadcasts an adult contemporary radio format.  From mid-November to December 25 each year, it switches to all-Christmas music.  The station's studios and offices are located at the 400 Poydras Tower in New Orleans' downtown district.

WLMG has an effective radiated power (ERP) of 100,000 watts, the maximum for non-grandfathered FM stations.  The transmitter site is off Behrman Highway in the Algiers neighborhood of New Orleans.  WLMG broadcasts in the HD Radio hybrid format.

History

WWL-FM
On March 15, 1970, the station first signed on the air as WWL-FM.  It was owned by Loyola University of the South, now known as Loyola University New Orleans.  Loyola also owned WWL-TV and AM powerhouse WWL.

WWL and WWL-FM had the same call sign but separate formats.  The AM was a full service middle of the road station, while WWL-FM played beautiful music.  It featured quarter hour sweeps of instrumental cover versions of popular songs with Hollywood and Broadway show tunes.

Top 40 and easy listening
In the mid-1970s, station management decided to go in a radically different direction, seeking a younger demographic for WWL-FM, as the FM flipped to a Top 40 format. However, the flip occurred during an era where most young people still were listening to inexpensive AM radios for their favorite hits.  The station failed to make much headway against AM Top 40 leader WTIX.

By May 1976, WWL-FM returned to easy listening music.  The format featured mostly instrumental songs with several soft vocals each hour.  On December 26, 1980, to separate the FM station's image from its AM and TV counterparts, the call letters were changed to WAJY.  The station, calling itself "Joy 102," moved closer to a 50/50 mix of instrumentals and vocals, some from soft rock artists such as Elton John, Olivia Newton-John, Stevie Wonder and Chicago.

Switch to WLMG
Through the 1980s, the easy format saw its audience continuing to age, while most advertisers seek young and middle-aged listeners.  In 1987, the station completed its transition to a soft adult contemporary format, eliminating the instrumentals.  The call sign was changed to WLMG, and rebranded as "Magic 102."  With most radios in the 1990s going from analog dials to digital, the station began calling itself "Magic 101.9" in 1995.

Over the next decade, WWL and WLMG changed hands several times.  In 1989, Loyola University sold the stations to Keymarket Communications.  The TV station was sold to a group of its employees, using the name Rampart Broadcasting.  In July 1995, the radio stations were acquired by River City Broadcasting.  Later ownership switched to Sinclair Broadcast Group.  In December 1999, WWL and WLMG were acquired by Entercom.

In the early 2000s, WLMG moved to a mainstream adult contemporary format. In 2006, the WWL-FM call sign returned to New Orleans on 105.3 FM.

References

External links

WLMG
Mainstream adult contemporary radio stations in the United States
Radio stations established in 1970
1970 establishments in Louisiana
Audacy, Inc. radio stations